Dennis Keith Bowen (September 9, 1950 – March 9, 2012) was an American character actor. His filmography included numerous films, more than one hundred television shows, and over one thousand television commercials during his career.

Early life 
Bowen was born in Gainesville, Florida, on September 9, 1950.

Career 
Bowen served in the United States Navy before pursuing an acting career. Outside of acting, Bowen was a recipient of the Medal of Valor from the California State Fireman's Association. Bowen's film credits included Record City, Van Nuys Blvd., Gas Pump Girls, and Caddyshack II. His best-known television roles included the 1970s ABC television series, Welcome Back, Kotter, in which he had a recurring role as Todd Ludlow.

Personal life 
Bowen died on March 9, 2012, at the age of 61. He was survived by his partner, Judy Holliday, and his daughter. Bowen was a resident of the Toluca Lake neighborhood of Los Angeles.

Filmography

Film

Television

References

External links

1950 births
2012 deaths
20th-century American male actors
21st-century American male actors
American male television actors
Male actors from Gainesville, Florida
Male actors from Los Angeles
United States Navy sailors